Phirozshah Dorabji Mehta (2 October 1902 – 2 May 1994) was an Indian writer, lecturer (primarily on religious topics) and pianist. His other academic interests included subjects such as astronomy, poetry and philosophy.

Early life
Mehta was born to Parsi Zoroastrian parents in Cambay, Gujarat, India.

Education
After his schooling at Royal College, Colombo, he won a scholarship to Trinity College, Cambridge where he read Natural Sciences and History. The scholarship was not allowed due to his lack of a birth certificate; birth certificates were not always issued in his home state of Gujarat. Despite being taken as far as the House of Lords, no grant was given. Private sponsorship was eventually secured and he was able to commence his studies. During his final year at Cambridge, he fell ill and was unable to complete his studies. Twenty-six years later, after studying intensively for only ten weeks, he took the finals exam in history and was awarded his master's degree.

Pianist
From 1924 until 1932 he studied the piano with the world-renowned pianist Solomon, giving recitals in India and Britain. Due to illness he was unable to follow his chosen career as a concert pianist and
piano teacher. The conductor Zubin Mehta was one of his early piano pupils.

Philosophy
He now devised his own system of physical education to promote health and self-expression through rhythmic movement and breathing and taught this method for fifteen years. People as diverse as C.B. Fry, the England cricket captain, and Douglas Kennedy, president of the English Folk Dance and Song Society, came to him for lessons.

From early childhood Phiroz Mehta had a burning interest in religion and philosophy and he was closely involved with the Theosophical Society for many years. At the age of 16 he was running the Colombo branch.

In 1956 his first major book, Early Indian Religious Thought, was published. It was not however until 1976, after extensive study, research and travel in India that he completed The Heart of Religion, a profound study of the essence which is common to all religious experience. During these years a frequent visitor to his south London home, Dilkusha, for advice on Eastern religions was Fritjof Capra, author of The Tao of Physics et alia. He subsequently published three more books, Zarathushtra (1985), Buddhahood (1988) and Holistic Consciousness (1989).

Through his knowledge of current scientific thinking and his lifelong study of major religions (notably Christianity, Buddhism, Zarathushtrianism, Hinduism, and Qabalah) together with life experience in both India and Great Britain, Phiroz Mehta not only bridged the fields of science and religion but also linked the cultural heritage of the East and the West.

During his lifetime he gave over three thousand lectures on religion and Indian culture to learned societies, university students, schools and conference centres in England, the Netherlands, Germany, India and at his London home, Dilkusha.

Phiroz Mehta always insisted that he was not to be regarded as a guru or as a leader of any movement but essentially as a fellow student. He regarded every person as being unique, discovering truth through his or her own way of life.

Bibliography

Early Indian Religious Thought (1956)
The Heart of Religion (1976)
Zarathushtra: The Transcendental Vision (1985)
Buddhahood (1988)
Holistic Consciousness (1989)

Posthumous publications

Insight into Individual Living (1995)
The Oakroom Talks on Buddhism (1998)

References

External links
Being Truly Human - The website of the Phiroz Mehta Trust - UK Registered Charity 328061

1902 births
1994 deaths
Writers from Gujarat
People from Anand district
People from British Ceylon
Alumni of Trinity College, Cambridge
Alumni of Royal College, Colombo
Parsi people
Gujarati people
Sri Lankan people of Indian descent
Sri Lankan Zoroastrians
English-language writers from India
Indian religious writers
British people of Indian descent
British people of Parsi descent